Russ Lawton is a professional drummer from Vermont.  He is best known as the drummer from the solo band of Phish guitarist Trey Anastasio.  Lawton also performs with the Vermont jam band Strangefolk and The Chrome Cowboys.  Lawton performed on Mike Gordon's albums Inside In and "The Green Sparrow". Russ sat in with the Vermont-based "Book'em Blues Band" for an evening of blues and rock on April 14, 2009 at Nectar's in Burlington, Vermont. Among those Russ has worked with is Ish drummer Jason Osborn. Lawton appeared on Late Night With Jimmy Fallon with Trey Anastasio Band.

Lawton is a music tutor at Middlebury College. 

Russ uses Vic Firth drum sticks and gretsch drum kits.

Currently, Russ performs in Soule Monde, with Ray Paczkowski.

Living people
Year of birth missing (living people)